Thierry Alain Mbognou (born 30 November 1992) is a Cameroonian footballer who plays as a midfielder for the Slovenian PrvaLiga club Krka. He previously played for Schaan in Liechtenstein and for Rheindorf Altach II in Austria.

References

External links 
 Nogomania profile 
 

1992 births
Living people
Footballers from Yaoundé
Cameroonian footballers
Association football midfielders
Cameroonian expatriate footballers
Expatriate footballers in Liechtenstein
Expatriate footballers in Austria
Cameroonian expatriate sportspeople in Austria
Expatriate footballers in Slovenia
Cameroonian expatriate sportspeople in Slovenia
NK Krka players